Jonathan Daniel Barboza Bonilla (born 2 November 1990) is a Uruguayan professional footballer who plays as a midfielder for Colombian club Sante Fe.

References

External links
Profile at ESPN FC

1990 births
Living people
Uruguayan footballers
Uruguayan expatriate footballers
Liverpool F.C. (Montevideo) players
C.A. Rentistas players
FC Lugano players
Sud América players
C.A. Cerro players
Independiente Medellín footballers
Montevideo Wanderers F.C. players
Uruguayan Segunda División players
Uruguayan Primera División players
Swiss Challenge League players
Categoría Primera A players
Association football midfielders
Uruguayan expatriate sportspeople in Switzerland
Uruguayan expatriate sportspeople in Colombia
Expatriate footballers in Switzerland
Expatriate footballers in Colombia